Santiago Fernández Fernández (born 7 March 1985) is a Mexican former football forward who last played for Club Puebla in Liga MX. Once hailed as one of Club América's (and Mexico's) top footballing prospects, Fernández disappeared from the sport after a brief spell in FC Barcelona's youth squad, only to resurface a few years later for América. He is considered the worst player in the history of Mexican soccer.

Club career 
His talent was soon recognized by coach Manuel Lapuente, and promoted him to the senior squad in late 2002. His professional debut came during the Clausura 2003 season, on 25 January 2003; in a game against San Luis. After a few more appearances as a late substitute, Lapuente inserted Fernández in the starting lineup of a game against Club Atlas.

Soon after, Dutch coach Leo Beenhakker took over the reins of the club and relegated Fernández to the bench. Following an Apertura 2003, Santiago decided to try his luck abroad, signing with FC Barcelona B to play the 2004–05 season.

At FC Barcelona, Tronco Fernández had limited play time. In 2006, after a postseason loss to Tigres UANL in the Apertura 2006 tournament and a disappointing start to the Clausura 2006 season, Manuel Lapuente made his way back into the head coaching position at América. Immediately, Lapuente sought out Fernández and convinced the young striker to play once more for América. Santiago showed no signs of rust, scoring in a CONCACAF Champions Cup quarterfinal match against Jamaica's Portmore United, which América won 5–2. Fernández also participated in the Mexico league's Clausura 2006 season for the Águilas.

After the off-season shakeup that saw strikers Kléber Boas and Aarón Padilla shipped out to other clubs, and signees Vicente Matías Vuoso and Salvador Cabañas join the team, Fernández was primed to secure a regular spot in the team's lineup, under new coach Luis Fernando Tena. América under the leadership of Tena suffered; he was fired. Fernández saw little playing time, although coming off the bench most games. With new coach Daniel Brailovsky, Fernández played less. The media reported that there was a feud between the two. Before the 2008 Clasura started, Fernández left to Toluca.

Santiago joined Club Puebla for the 2009 season, in hopes of helping the team win the league, but six months later he announced that his football career was over.

International career
Fernández was selected to represent his country at the 2005 Under-20 World Cup qualifying tournament, in which Mexico failed to advance to the main event, suffering two defeats and drawing once.

He is known for his role at the 2008 CONCACAF Men's Pre-Olympic Tournament; he was a substitute in the last match against Haiti, when he, along Luis Angel Landín and César Villaluz, missed easy goals. Santiago missed a shot from nearly 2 meters from goal with no keeper and was unable to get to the ball several times in crosses from his teammates.

References 

1985 births
Living people
Footballers from Mexico City
Association football forwards
Mexican footballers
Mexico international footballers
Club América footballers
FC Barcelona Atlètic players
Deportivo Toluca F.C. players
Club Puebla players
Liga MX players
Mexican expatriate footballers
Expatriate footballers in Spain
Mexican expatriate sportspeople in Spain